Pascagoula is a city in Jackson County, Mississippi, United States. It is the principal city of the Pascagoula metropolitan area, and is part of the Gulfport–Biloxi–Pascagoula Combined Statistical Area and the Gulfport-Biloxi metropolitan area. The population was 22,392 at the 2010 census, down from 26,200 at the 2000 census. As of 2019 the estimated population was 21,699. It is the county seat of Jackson County.

The current mayor of the city is Jay Willis.

History

Early history

The name Pascagoula, which means "bread eater", is taken from the Pascagoula, a group of Native Americans found in villages along the Pascagoula River some distance above its mouth. Hernando de Soto seems to have made the first contact with them in the 1540s, though little is known of that encounter. Pierre Le Moyne d'Iberville, founder of the colony of Louisiana, left a more detailed account from an expedition of this region in 1700. The first detailed account comes from Jean-Baptiste Le Moyne de Bienville, younger brother of Iberville, whom the Pascagoula visited at Fort Maurepas in present-day Ocean Springs, shortly after it was settled and while the older brother was away in France. There are few details that are certain about these people, except that their language seemed not to have shared an etymological root with the larger native groups to the north, the Choctaw particularly (who speak a Muskogean language). There has been speculation that their language may be related to Biloxi. (The Biloxi people spoke a now extinct Siouan language, which is related to the languages spoken by the Sioux, Crow, and Ho-Chunk.) The territory of the Biloxi people seems to have ranged from the areas of what are now called Biloxi Bay to Bayou La Batre (Alabama) and  up the Pascagoula River, and the Pascagoula people's territory seems to have ranged between some distance north of there to the confluence of the Leaf and Chickasawhay rivers. However, the Pascagoula language is completely undocumented – thus, genealogical affiliations from other authors are speculation.

The first European settlers of Pascagoula were Jean Baptiste Baudreau Dit Graveline, Joseph Simon De La Pointe and his aunt, Madame Chaumont.

Modern history

The region changed hands over the next century, being occupied variously by the English, French, and Spanish until well after the American Revolutionary War. It did not come into the permanent possession of the United States until 1812 when it was added to the Mississippi Territory. At one point, for 74 days in 1810, Pascagoula was a part of what was known as the Republic of West Florida. Pascagoula was incorporated as a village in 1892 and obtained city status in 1901. Today's downtown Pascagoula used to be the town of Scranton, Mississippi (incorporated in 1870) until the two towns merged in 1912.

In October 1973, an alleged unidentified flying object sighting and alien abduction is said to have occurred when co-workers Charles Hickson and Calvin Parker claimed they were abducted by aliens while fishing near Pascagoula. The incident, Pascagoula Abduction, earned substantial mass media attention. In June 2019, Pascagoula placed an historical marker near the alleged abduction site.

Hurricane Katrina

On August 29, 2005, Hurricane Katrina's  storm surge devastated Pascagoula, much like Biloxi and Gulfport and the rest of the Mississippi Gulf Coast. Katrina came ashore during the high tide of 6:12 AM,  more. Nearly 92% of Pascagoula was flooded. Most homes along Beach Boulevard were destroyed, and FEMA trailers became an omnipresent sight. Due to the media focus on the plight of New Orleans and Biloxi-Gulfport in the aftermath of Katrina, many Pascagoula citizens have expressed feeling neglected or even forgotten following the storm. Most Pascagoula residents did not possess flood insurance, and many were required to put their homes on pilings before being given a permit to rebuild. Additionally, TITANTubes (sometimes referred to as geotubes) were installed under the beach to serve as low-profile dune cores to protect the evacuation route.

United States Navy officials announced that two  guided missile destroyers that were under construction at Northrop Grumman Ship Systems in Pascagoula had been damaged by the storm, as well as the amphibious assault ship .

Hurricane Katrina damaged over forty Mississippi libraries, flooding the Pascagoula Public Library's first floor and causing mold in the building.

Points of interest

The United States post office in Pascagoula contains a mural, Legend of the Singing River, painted in 1939 by Lorin Thompson. Murals were produced from 1934 to 1943 in the United States through the Section of Painting and Sculpture, later called the Section of Fine Arts, of the Treasury Department. The mural was restored in the 1960s as the building became the Pascagoula Public Library. The building was damaged by Hurricane Katrina in 2005, and the mural was placed in storage. In 2010, it was re-installed at the new Pascagoula post office on Jackson Avenue.

Pascagoula is the home of the Old Spanish Fort, the oldest building in the Mississippi Valley.  It was built sometime in the 1750s.

Geography
Pascagoula is located along Mississippi Sound, on the east side of the mouth of the Pascagoula River. It is bordered to the north by Moss Point and to the west, across the Pascagoula River, by Gautier.

U.S. Route 90 (Denny Avenue) passes through the city, leading northeast  to Grand Bay, Alabama, and west  to Biloxi.

Demographics

2020 census

As of the 2020 United States census, there were 22,010 people, 8,415 households, and 4,865 families residing in the city.

2000 census
As of the census of 2000, there were 26,200 people, 9,878 households, and 6,726 families residing in the city. The population density was 1,726.4 people per square mile (666.4/km). There were 10,931 housing units at an average density of 720.3 per square mile (278.0/km). The racial makeup of the city was 67.15% White, 28.97% African American, 0.18% Native American, 0.97% Asian, 0.02% Pacific Islander, 1.67% from other races, and 1.04% from two or more races. Hispanic or Latino of any race were 3.89% of the population. There were 9,878 households, of which 34.5% had children under the age of 18 living with them, 44.6% were married couples living together, 18.8% had a female householder with no husband present, and 31.9% were non-families. 27.0% of all households were made up of individuals, and 9.7% had someone living alone who was 65 years of age or older. The average household size was 2.52 and the average family size was 3.05.

In the city, the population was 26.9% under the age of 18, 12.0% from 18 to 24, 28.9% from 25 to 44, 20.4% from 45 to 64, and 11.9% who were 65 years of age or older. The median age was 33 years. For every 100 females, there were 101.8 males. For every 100 females age 18 and over, there were 100.9 males. The median income for a household in the city was $32,042, and the median income for a family was $39,044. Males had a median income of $30,313 versus $22,594 for females. The per capita income for the city was $16,891. About 18.1% of families and 20.7% of the population were below the poverty line, including 31.4% of those under age 18 and 13.0% of those age 65 or over.

According to census 2010, Pascagoula has the highest percentage of Puerto Ricans in Mississippi. Puerto Ricans make up nearly 5% of the city.

Economy

Pascagoula is a major industrial city of Mississippi, on the Gulf Coast. Prior to World War II, the town was a sleepy fishing village of about 5,000. The population skyrocketed with the war-driven shipbuilding industry. Although the city's population seemed to peak in the late 1970s and early 1980s as Cold War defense spending was at its height, Pascagoula experienced some new growth and development in the years before Hurricane Katrina. Today, Pascagoula is home to the state's largest private, single-site employer, Ingalls Shipbuilding, owned by Huntington Ingalls Industries. Other major industries include the largest Chevron refinery in the world; Rolls-Royce Naval Marine specializing in U.S. Navy ship propulsion; and First Chemical/Chemours.

Naval Station Pascagoula was located on Singing River Island and was homeport to several Navy warships, as well as a large Coast Guard contingent. However, Naval Station Pascagoula was decommissioned as part of the 2005 BRAC recommendations and ceased operations in 2006.

Education
The Pascagoula-Gautier School District serves Pascagoula. Resurrection Catholic School is a parochial school for grades PK3-12 established in 1882.

Notable people

 Brent Anderson, country music singer
 Vick Ballard, NFL player
 Earl Blair, Canadian Football League player
 George Blair, NFL player
 Steve Bowman, NFL player
 Isaac Brown, Wichita State University Basketball Coach
 Terrell Buckley, NFL player
 Jimmy Buffett, musician, songwriter, author, actor, and businessman
 Joey Butler, MLB player
 William Colmer, US Congressman
 Chuck Commiskey, NFL player
 David L. Cook, Christian recording star and comedian
 Fred Cook, professional football player
 Tony Dees, Olympic silver medalist in 1992 olympics 
 Uncle Elmer (real name: Stan Frazier), former professional wrestler 
 Senquez Golson, NFL player
 Litterial Green, NBA player
 Ira B. Harkey Jr., editor and publisher of Pascagoula Chronicle; won Pulitzer Prize for courageous editorials devoted to processes of law and reason during integration crisis in Mississippi in 1962
 Antonio Harvey, NBA forward
 Richard Harvey, NFL player
 Colton Herta, IndyCar driver
 Dr. Calvin Huey, Chemist, businessman, first African-American football player at Navy.
 Sam Leslie, former Major League Baseball player (New York Giants and Brooklyn Dodgers) and Mississippi Sports Hall of Fame member  
 Trent Lott, US Senator
 Aubrey Matthews, NFL player
 Shane Matthews, NFL player
 Fishbait Miller, Doorkeeper of the United States House of Representatives
 Jennifer Palmieri, Politician
 Clyde Powers, NFL player
 Channing Tatum, Actor
 Kim Seaman, former professional baseball player (St. Louis Cardinals)
 Toni Seawright, first African American Miss Mississippi
 Charles Sellier Jr., television and film producer, including The Life and Times of Grizzly Adams
 Tony Sipp, Major League Baseball player
 Judson Spence, musician, singer, songwriter
 Diron Talbert, NFL player
 Lynn Thomas, NFL player for San Francisco 49ers
 Sarah Thomas, first female NFL official
 Harry "The Hat" Walker, Major League Baseball player
 Otis Wonsley, NFL player

Sister city
  –  Chico, California (U.S.) 2005

In popular culture
Pascagoula is the setting for Ray Stevens's novelty song "Mississippi Squirrel Revival".
Jimmy Buffett wrote and performs a song called "The Pascagoula Run".
Pascagoula is also home to the Mississippi's "Phantom Barber" where a man would run around cutting women's lock of hair at night.
There have been several free concerts held in Pascagoula by famous musicians including Charlie Daniels Band (2006), Blake Shelton (2007), and Jimmy Buffett (2015)
Pascagoula, along with several other Mississippi gulf coast cities, participates in hosting the "Crusin' The Coast" car show every year which was named America's best car show in 2020 by USA Today.

See also

 Pascagoula Abduction
 Pascagoula River High Rise Bridge

References

External links

City of Pascagoula official website

 
Cities in Mississippi
Cities in Jackson County, Mississippi
County seats in Mississippi
Cities in Pascagoula metropolitan area
French-American culture in Mississippi
Populated coastal places in Mississippi
World War II Heritage Cities